Local elections were held in Kazakhstan on 10 January 2021 to elect in total of all 3,246 members of the 214 mäslihats (local assemblies) which included 489 regional members and 2,757 municipal members. This is the first election to take place under party-list proportional representation system that was enacted in 2018, giving political parties a role in local races and it coincided with the 2021 legislative elections.

The ruling Nur Otan party swept a majority of 3083 local seats followed by the Auyl People's Democratic Patriotic Party (AUYL) with 268 and the Ak Zhol Democratic Party with 267 and People's Party of Kazakhstan with 107 seats while the Adal, which earned the fewest total votes of 2.1%, had managed to garner 24 seats in the district mäslihats by passing the 7% electoral threshold in some races.

Background 
Throughout the history of Kazakhstan, local deputies were elected from single-member districts.

In 2018, the Parliament of Kazakhstan approved a bill that would allow all the members be chosen through party-list proportional representation. According to the Ministry of Justice, "the proportional system will ensure full representation of all political parties, will allow the development of party building, increase the role of parties in the political life of the country and take into account the interests of the people." However, this move was met with skepticism as it would bar self-nominated candidates from running in the races or even being MP of the mäslihat which some accused was a violation of the Constitution.

Campaign 
On 10 December 2020, the Central Election Commission (OSK) registered in total of 8,334 candidates competing in the local races that were included in all 832 party lists in which 216 were from Nur Otan, 215 from Adal, 174 from Ak Zhol, 158 from Auyl, 69 from People's Party.

Results

Regional

Overall results

Seats earned by region

Municipal

Nationwide results

References

Local
Local elections in Kazakhstan